The 1983 Mid-Eastern Athletic Conference men's basketball tournament took place March 10–12 at Greensboro Coliseum in Greensboro, North Carolina. North Carolina A&T defeated , 71–64 in the championship game, to win its second consecutive MEAC Tournament title.

The Aggies earned an automatic bid to the 1983 NCAA tournament as a No. 12 seed in the West region.

Format
All seven conference members participated, with play beginning in the quarterfinal round. Teams were seeded based on their regular season conference record.

Bracket

* denotes overtime period

References

MEAC men's basketball tournament
1982–83 Mid-Eastern Athletic Conference men's basketball season
MEAC men's basketball tournament